The Polish Open in badminton is an international open held in Poland since 1975.
In the years before 1990 they were one of the few meeting places of the badminton players of the Eastern Bloc countries. The tournament belongs to the BE Circuit. Not to be confused with the Polish International.

Previous winners

Performance by nations

External links
Official Site

Badminton tournaments in Poland
Recurring sporting events established in 1975